This article shows the roster of all participating teams at the 2022 Men's U20 Volleyball European Championship.

Pool I

France 
The following is the France roster in the 2022 Men's U20 Volleyball European Championship.

Head coach: Jocelyn Trillon

Italy 
The following is the Italy roster in the 2022 Men's U20 Volleyball European Championship.

Head coach: Matteo Battocchio

Poland 
The following is the Poland roster in the 2022 Men's U20 Volleyball European Championship.

Head coach: Mateusz Grabda

Serbia 
The following is the Serbia roster in the 2022 Men's U20 Volleyball European Championship.

Head coach: Nedžad Osmankač

Slovakia 
The following is the Slovakia roster in the 2022 Men's U20 Volleyball European Championship.

Head coach: Ivan Hiadlovský

Slovenia 
The following is the Slovenia roster in the 2022 Men's U20 Volleyball European Championship.

Head coach: Jernej Rojc

Pool II

Belgium 
The following is the Belgium roster in the 2022 Men's U20 Volleyball European Championship.

Head coach: Kris Eyckmans

Bulgaria 
The following is the Bulgaria roster in the 2022 Men's U20 Volleyball European Championship.

Head coach: Martin Stoev

Czech Republic 
The following is the Czech Republic roster in the 2022 Men's U20 Volleyball European Championship.

Head coach: Jan Svoboda

Finland 
The following is the Finland roster in the 2022 Men's U20 Volleyball European Championship.

Head coach: Jouko Lindberg

Greece 
The following is the Greece roster in the 2022 Men's U20 Volleyball European Championship.

Head coach: Nikolaos Mouchlias

Portugal 
The following is the Portugal roster in the 2022 Men's U20 Volleyball European Championship.

Head coach: Nuno Pereira

References 

Men's Junior European Volleyball Championship